A Minister of State in Ireland (also called a junior minister) is of non-cabinet rank attached to one or more Departments of State of the Government of Ireland and assists a Minister of that government.

, 33 women have served as Ministers of State in Ireland. Six of the twenty Ministers of State appointed by the government of Leo Varadkar in December 2022 were women, with two regularly attending cabinet. Some Ministers of State, including the Government Chief Whip, attend cabinet meetings in a non-voting capacity, but are not members of the Government. They are formally known as "Minister of State attending Government", or colloquially as "Super Junior" ministers. There are currently three Ministers of State who regularly attend cabinet, two of whom are women.

Appointment
The Ministers and Secretaries Act 1924 allowed the Executive Council (from 1937, the Government of Ireland) to appoint up to seven Parliamentary Secretaries to the Executive Council or to Executive Ministers. The Ministers and Secretaries (Amendment) (No. 2) Act 1977 abolished the position of Parliamentary Secretary, and created the new position of Minister of State. This Act was commenced on 1 January 1978. Unlike senior government ministers, who are appointed by the President of Ireland on the advice of the Taoiseach and the prior approval of Dáil Éireann, Ministers of State are appointed directly by the government, on the nomination of the Taoiseach. Members of either House of the Oireachtas (Dáil or Seanad) may be appointed to be a Minister of State at a Department of State.

History
Máire Geoghegan-Quinn was the first and only woman to be appointed as a Parliamentary Secretary, when she was appointed as Parliamentary Secretary to the Minister for Industry and Commerce by Jack Lynch in 1977. She was the first woman to be appointed as a Minister of State in 1978, as Minister of State at the Department of Industry, Commerce and Energy. In 1979, Geoghegan-Quinn would become the first women appointed to cabinet since 1921. There has been at least one woman Minister of State in all appointments since June 1981. To date, only one Senator, Pippa Hackett, who was appointed in June 2020, has been appointed as a Minister of State.

List of women ministers of state

Timeline

Notes

References

Bibliography
McNamara, Maedhbh; Mooney, Paschal (2000). Women in Parliament: Ireland 1918–2000. Dublin: Wolfhound Press. ISBN 0-86327-759-4.
McNamara, Maedhbh (2020). A Woman's Place is in the Cabinet 1919–2019. Drogheda: Sea Dog Books. ISBN 978-1-913275-06-8.

 
Ministers of state